Edward Adams may refer to:

Edward Adams (footballer) (1908–1981), English footballer who played for Tranmere Rovers
Edward Adams (surgeon) (1824–1856), English naval surgeon and naturalist
Edward Adams (boxer), British boxer
Eddie Adams (racing driver), former American racecar driver
Eddie Adams (photographer) (1933–2004), American photojournalist
Edward H. Adams (1910–1958), American college football and basketball coach
Edward J. Adams (1887–1921), American bank and train robber, killer
Dirk Diggler, alias of Eddie Adams, a character played by Mark Wahlberg in the film Boogie Nights
Edward Hamlyn Adams (1777–1842), British Member of Parliament for Carmarthenshire
Edward Joseph Adams (born 1944), American prelate of the Roman Catholic Church
Edward Dean Adams (1846–1931), American businessman, banker and numismatist

See also
Edward Adam, invented still modifications to improve chemical rectification
Ted Adams (disambiguation)
Adams (surname)